Marshal of Cripple Creek is a 1947 American Western film in the Red Ryder film series directed by R. G. Springsteen and written by Earle Snell. The film stars Allan Lane, Robert Blake, Martha Wentworth, Trevor Bardette, Tom London and Roy Barcroft. The film was released on August 15, 1947, by Republic Pictures.

Plot

Cast   
Allan Lane as Red Ryder
Robert Blake as Little Beaver 
Martha Wentworth as Duchess Wentworth
Trevor Bardette as Tom Lambert
Tom London as Baker
Roy Barcroft as Henchman Sweeney
Gene Roth as Long John Case 
William Self as Dick Lambert
Helen Wallace as Mae Lambert

References

External links 
 

1947 films
American Western (genre) films
1947 Western (genre) films
Republic Pictures films
Films directed by R. G. Springsteen
Films based on comic strips
Films based on American comics
American black-and-white films
1940s English-language films
1940s American films
Red Ryder films